Samuel Bruce Fewell Jr. (born July 8, 1939) was an American politician in the state of South Carolina and professional football player. He served in the South Carolina House of Representatives as a member of the Democratic Party from 1967 to 1976, representing York County, South Carolina. He played in the NFL from 1961 to 1963 and in the CFL in 1964. He is a lawyer.

Football career

References

1939 births
Living people
Democratic Party members of the South Carolina House of Representatives
South Carolina lawyers
People from Rock Hill, South Carolina